Alf Westerberg (born 15 November 1960) is a Swedish football manager.

References

External links
 Tipselit profile
 
 Fotbolltransfers profile

1960 births
Living people
Swedish footballers
Kalmar FF managers
Trelleborgs FF managers
Swedish football managers
Malmö FF non-playing staff
IFK Göteborg non-playing staff
Association footballers not categorized by position
IFK Göteborg managers